Undivided Assam refers to the then undivided greater state of Assam in India soon after the Indian Independence in 1947 until 1963.  In addition to the present-day Assam, it included the current states of Arunachal Pradesh, Meghalaya, Nagaland and Mizoram.  The capital of this state was Shillong, currently the capital of Meghalaya.  Undivided Assam included five of the seven contiguous states of Northeast India—with Tripura and Manipur not being a part of it. 

Prior to the Partition of India, Sylhet was a part of Assam.

The present day population of Undivided Assam would be 50 million which is slightly less than the population of South Korea.

Present day
After the partition, Undivided Assam was carved into following states:

References

1947 establishments in India
1963 disestablishments in India
1940s in Assam
1950s in Assam
1960s in Assam
Northeast India